Nanci María Augustina Parrilli (born 7 September 1953, San Martín de los Andes) is an Argentine Justicialist Party politician. She sat in the Argentine Senate representing Neuquén Province in the majority block of the Front for Victory from 2007 to 2013.

Parrilli attended school in San Martín de los Andes and qualified as a teacher of psychology in Bahía Blanca in 1976. She has extensive experience in the education sector.

Nanci Parrilli was elected to the Senate in 2007.

Parrilli's brother, Oscar Parrilli, was General Secretary of the Presidency for Cristina Fernández de Kirchner, and also served as senator for Neuquén.

External links
Senate profile

References

1953 births
Living people
People from Neuquén Province
Argentine people of Italian descent
Members of the Argentine Senate for Neuquén
Justicialist Party politicians
21st-century Argentine women politicians
21st-century Argentine politicians
Members of the Argentine Chamber of Deputies elected in Neuquén